David Gerard may refer to:

 Dave Gerard (cartoonist) (1909–2003), American cartoonist
 Dave Gerard (baseball) (1936–2001), baseball player
 David Gérard (born 1977), French rugby union player

See also
 David Gerrard (born 1945), New Zealand swimmer
 David Garrard (born 1978), American football quarterback
 David Garrard (property developer) (born 1939), British property developer
 Gerard David (c. 1460–1523), Dutch painter
 Gérard David (born 1944), Belgian cyclist